Rajendra Shukla may refer to:

Rajendra Shukla (poet) is a Gujarati poet. He taught at various places before voluntarily retiring. He published several poetry collections which won him several major Gujarati literary awards.
Rajendra Shukla (politician) is a member of the Bharatiya Janata Party (BJP) and member of the legislative assembly from Rewa constituency of Madhya Pradesh.